Duniam is a surname. Notable people with the surname include:

 Jonathon Duniam (born 1982), Australian politician
 Sophie Duniam (born 1987), British musician
 Urban Duniam (born 1931), Australian rules footballer

See also
 Dunham (surname)